Knoepffler is a surname. Notable people with the surname include:

Campari Knoepffler (born 1959), Nicaraguan swimmer
Nikolaus Knoepffler (born 1962), German philosopher and theologian